
Gmina Grudziądz is a rural gmina (administrative district) in Grudziądz County, Kuyavian-Pomeranian Voivodeship, in north-central Poland. Its seat is the town of Grudziądz, although the town is not part of the territory of the gmina. Meer of the Gmina Grudziądz is Jan Tesmer.

Villages
Gmina Grudziądz contains the villages and settlements of Biały Bór, Brankówka, Dusocin, Gać, Gogolin, Grabowiec, Mały Rudnik, Mokre, Nowa Wieś, Parski, Piaski, Pieńki Królewskie, Rozgarty, Ruda, Sosnówka, Stary Folwark, Świerkocin, Sztynwag, Szynych, Turznice, Wałdowo Szlacheckie, Węgrowo, Wielki Wełcz, Wielkie Lniska and Zakurzewo.

Neighbouring gminas
Gmina Grudziądz is bordered by the town of Grudziądz and by the gminas of Chełmno, Dragacz, Gruta, Nowe, Płużnica, Radzyń Chełmiński, Rogóźno, Sadlinki and Stolno.

Notes

References
Polish official population figures 2006

Grudziadz
Grudziądz County